The bills of the 113th United States Congress list includes proposed federal laws that were introduced in the 113th United States Congress.  This Congress lasted from January 3, 2013, to January 3, 2015.

The United States Congress is the bicameral legislature of the federal government of the United States consisting of two houses: the lower house known as the House of Representatives and the upper house known as the Senate. The House and Senate are equal partners in the legislative process—legislation cannot be enacted without the consent of both chambers.  The bills listed below are arranged on the basis of which chamber they were first introduced in, and then chronologically by date.

Once a bill is approved by one house, it is sent to the other which may pass, reject, or amend it. For the bill to become law, both houses must agree to identical versions of the bill. After passage by both houses, a bill is enrolled and sent to the president for signature or veto.  Bills from the 113th Congress that have successfully completed this process become law and are listed as Acts of the 113th United States Congress.

Introduced in the House of Representatives

Passed by the House, waiting in the Senate

Bills

House resolutions

Concurrent resolutions

House joint resolutions

Introduced in the Senate

Passed by the Senate, waiting in the House

Other legislation

Concurrent resolutions

Senate joint resolutions

See also
 List of United States federal legislation
 Acts of the 113th United States Congress
 Procedures of the U.S. Congress

References

External links
Congress's Legislation Website
Govtrack.us – tracks Congressional activities
Library of Congress's legislation site 
Washingtonwatch.com  – tracks legislation, focuses on spending
OpenCongress – tracks legislation

 
Bills,Congress,113